Tasnim Mohammad Mahmoud Isleem (born 4 March 2001), known as Tasnim Isleem, is a Jordanian footballer who plays as a midfielder for the Jordan women's national team.

References

External links

2001 births
Living people
Jordan women's international footballers
Jordanian women's footballers
Women's association football midfielders
Sportspeople from Amman
Jordanian Muslims
Jordan Women's Football League players